The Botswana national netball team represent Botswana in international netball tests. Botswana competed in the 2007 World Netball Championships, their first appearance at a World Championships, finishing tenth. They also came second at the 2008 Nations Cup, and finished 13th at the 2011 World Championships in Singapore. As of 2 December 2019, Botswana are 24th in the INF World Rankings.

Team

Players 
On 15 June 2011, the Botswana Netball Association (BONA) announced an initial 15-member squad for the 2011 World Netball Championships in Singapore, held from 3–10 July. From the initial squad, twelve players were chosen represent Botswana at the tournament, held from 3–10 July.

Coaching staff 
 Head coach: Claire Duke
 Assistant coach: Adam Hill 
 Manager: Jesse-Leigh Baker

Competitive history

Netball World Cup

Other events
 2004 COSANA tournament: 3rd
 2006 COSANA tournament: 3rd
 2008 Nations Cup: 2nd
 2014 Nations Cup: 3rd
 2015 Nations Cup: 4th

See also
 Netball in Botswana

References

National netball teams of Africa
Netball in Botswana
Netball